Björn Sveinsson Björnsson (15 October 1909 – 14 April 1998) was the son of Iceland's first president Sveinn Björnsson and was one of about twenty Icelanders who fought for the Nazi regime during World war II.

Biography

Björn graduated from Menntaskóli in Reykjavik in the spring of 1930. He then traveled to Germany and began to work at Eimskip in Hamburg. He had planned to study music, but his fiancée María was expecting a child, so he had to work. She and Björn married between 1930 and 1936. In the following years Björn and María had two daughters: Hjördís and Brynhildur Georgía, but they divorced in 1937.

When the Nazi Party rose to power in Germany, Björn was very impressed by their politics, and when World War II broke out Björn applied to join the Waffen-SS. Björn was stated to be an enthusiastic Nazi, even writing on his application "I certify that I am of pure Aryan stock. Heil Hitler!". Björn was a soldier in the 5th SS Panzer Division Wiking, where he served on the eastern front in Caucasus as a correspondent. Björn would regularly broadcast about the war to Iceland on the front lines. Only one of his recordings has survived, in which he interviews two supposed cossack farmers about the evils of the Soviet union. It was played for Icelandic audiences to portray Nazi Germany, not as an aggressor, but as a saviour of people from the bolsheviks.

Upon being promoted to Unterscharführer in 1941, Björn was sent to an officer school in Bad Tölz. After his exam, he was sent to occupied Denmark to work in the Copenhagen German propaganda department, publishing German propaganda in newspapers and radio broadcasts. He also published a magazine called Daggry which was a translated version of a magazine published by the SS. Björn had a ten-day period where he would talk on the radio, which made him fairly famous in Denmark. He stated that the Danish resistance movement was hunting him. Late in the war he received the Iron cross 2nd class.

When Germany surrendered in May 1945, the Danish partisans arrested or killed the remaining SS troops in the country. Björn was taken prisoner and held captive for over a year. He was suddenly released in the winter of 1946. A theory goes on that Georgia Björnsson, Björn's mother, pleaded King Christian X to show her son leniency. Björn went secretly to Sweden, from where he was smuggled back to Iceland. In Iceland, Björn was not received very well. The poet and author Halldór Laxness even stated that Björn was "one of the worst Icelandic men who ever existed". Björn built a house in Kópavogur and married the singer Nanna Egilsdóttir. In 1949 Björn, like many other Nazis, traveled to Argentina, along with Nanna, but they did not prosper there, so a couple of years later they moved back to Iceland, where Björn gained work at Keflavík airport. Björn and Nanna then moved to Germany where Björn worked with the American army alongside some other commercial jobs. In 1962 Björn got work as an agent for Encyclopedia Britannica. Towards the end of his work life, Björn worked as a guide in Iceland, specialising in German tourists.

Björn's memoirs were published in Reykjavík in 1989 as Ævi mín og sagan sem ekki mátti segja: Endurminningar Björns Sv. Björnssonar ("my life and the story that could not be told: recollections of Björn Sv. Björnsson").

Björn died in the spring of 1998 of natural causes.

Sources

Further reading
 Steingrímur St. Th. Sigurðsson, Ellefu líf. Saga um lífshlaup Brynhildar Georgíu Björnsson-Borger (Reykjavík 1983) [biography of one of Björn's daughters]
 Helga Hrafn Guðmundsson, "Björn Sv. Björnsson: Hinn „óaðfinnanlegi“ íslenski nasistieftir'", Lemúrinn (19 February 2013)
 "Sonur forsetans dæmdi mann til dauða", Fornleifur (25 October 2015)
 Elías Þórsson, "The Story That Could Never Be Told: Iceland’s First Son, The SS Officer", The Reykjavík Grapevine (24 August 2017)

1909 births
1998 deaths
Finnish Waffen-SS personnel